List of awards and nominations received by Dev may refer to:

 List of awards and nominations received by Dev (Bengali actor)
 List of awards and nominations received by Dev (singer)